Lilyvale is a locality in the Toowoomba Region local government area on the Darling Downs in southern Queensland, Australia.  At the 2016 Australian Census, Lilyvale recorded a population of 55. A prominent hill in the north of the area remains mostly vegetated and reaches elevations above 590 m.  A second hill in the southeast rises to around 570 m.  The rest of Lilyvale has been cleared for agricultural purposes.

History
The Downs Co-operative Dairy Association opened a cheese factory at Lilyvale in 1926.

References

Toowoomba Region